Caraculo (also known as Finlay) is a town in south-central Angola.

Transport 

It is served by a station on the southern line of Angolan Railways (CFM).  Near this town the railway has been deviated from its original alignment to avoid steep gradients.

In 2008, a concrete sleeper factory was being established at this town.

See also 

 Transport in Angola

References 

Populated places in Angola